Wings is an album by the flugelhornist and composer Franco Ambrosetti which was recorded in 1983 and released on the Enja label the following year.

Reception

The Allmusic review by Scott Yanow stated "flugelhornist Franco Ambrosetti's third in a series of consistently rewarding recordings for Enja has a particularly strong group ... The music is solid post-bop, and Clark's French horn is a major plus in the ensembles".

Track listing
All compositions by Franco Ambrosetti except where noted
 "Miss, Your Quelque Shows" – 10:44
 "Gin and Pentatonic" – 13:16
 "Atisiul" (Flavio Ambrosetti) – 14:40
 "More Wings for Wheelers" (George Gruntz) – 4:20

Personnel
Franco Ambrosetti – flugelhorn
Mike Brecker – tenor saxophone
John Clark – French horn
Kenny Kirkland – piano
Buster Williams – bass
Daniel Humair – drums

References

Franco Ambrosetti albums
1984 albums
Enja Records albums